Arun III is a run-of-the river-type hydro-electric project under construction on the Arun River in Sankhuwasabha District of Province 1, Nepal. The project is of 900 megawatts capacity and will be the largest hydropower plant in South Asia. It is constructed by SJVN Arun III Power Development Company Private Limited (a wholly owned subsidiary of SJVN Ltd).

The estimated cost is USD 1.6 billion including $156m to develop the transmission line. It will generate about 4,018.87 million units of electricity annually. In 2020 February, financial closure was done by the governments of India and Nepal. The project is constructed on a build-own-operate and transfer (BOOT) basis. SJVN will operate the plant for 30 years and then transfer the ownership to the Nepal government. During 30 years of operation, 21.9% of power will be provided to Nepal free of cost. The project’s construction is expected to generate 3,000 jobs in Nepal and India.

Project details
The project consists of a 70m high and 466m wide concrete gravity dam across Arun River which will be able to store 13.94 million cubic metres of water. The dam will have six (now only five) sluice gates. There will be four underground desilting basins (now not considered in the project design i.e. desilting basins have been removed from the design) having a length of 420m, a width of 16m and a height of 24m each. A 9.5m diameter tunnel having length of 11.74 km followed by 9.5m diameter two steel-lined pressure shafts and four penstocks will convey the flow to the powerhouse. The tailrace tunnel is 192m long and has a diameter of 10m. Four vertical Francis turbine units of 225MW each will be housed in an underground powerhouse. The gross head is 308m and the design net head is 286.21m. The power evacuation will be done via a 300 km-long, 400kV transmission line to India. It will be routed along Diding (Nepal) to Dhalkebar (Nepal) and finally to Muzzafarpur (India).

The civil contractor is Jaiprakash Associates. The hydro-mechanical contractor is Om Metals. The electro-mechanical contractor is BHEL. Total Management Services will monitor the environmental aspects. 269 families will be affected by the project construction. They will be compensated by providing 30 units of electricity each free of cost every month.

History
The project was formed by Nepal Government in 1992. However, the NGOs, environment protectors and individuals worried against rampant privatization in the culture and natural beauty of the Arun valley expressed numerous concerns against it. The criticism of the project included fear of increase of already-high electricity tariffs and whether the size of the project was appropriate for a country of Nepal's size. There was also a debate for the road to the project area concerning deforestation and habitat fragmentation. Finally in 1995, the World Bank decided to withdraw their support, effectively cancelling the project.

The Project resurfaced and a Project Development Agreement was signed in November 2014. The surplus power from the project will be exported to India from Dhalkebar in Nepal to Muzaffarpur in Bihar. In 2017 the cabinet of India approved the project for construction.

See also
List of power stations in Nepal

References

Ram S. Mahat, The Loss of Arun III, .

External links
Whitewater adventurers kayaking through the stretch of Arun river that Arun- III project will affect.

Politics of Nepal
Dams under construction
Hydroelectric power stations in Nepal